The 2007 North Queensland Cowboys season was the 13th in the club's history. Coached by Graham Murray and captained by Johnathan Thurston, they competed in the NRL's Telstra Premiership. They finished the regular season in 3rd place, falling one game short of the Grand Final after losing to the Manly-Warringah Sea Eagles.

Season summary 
The Cowboys started the 2007 NRL season strongly, winning their first four games. By the halfway point of the season, they were placed inside the top four, despite losing key forward Luke O'Donnell for the season in Round 4.

In August, News Limited sold its majority stake in the club to the Cowboys Leagues Club for just over $2 million. News Limited took over the club in late 2001, helping it through a turbulent and difficult era.

Following five losses from seven games, the Cowboys dropped to 8th place in Round 20. A strong finish to the regular season, in which they won their final five games, saw them finish in 3rd, their highest ever placing at the time. Their first two finals games were played at home, defeating the Canterbury Bulldogs (20–18) and the New Zealand Warriors (49–12), to move within one game of the Grand Final. The Cowboys' season ended the following week, losing to Manly in the preliminary final.

Club legend Paul Bowman retired at the end of the 2007 season. The last foundation player from the club's inaugural season, Bowman played 203 games for the Cowboys over 13 seasons. The club's Player of the Year medal was named in his honour following his retirement. He became an assistant coach with the club in 2008. 2007 also saw the debut of 19-year-old Scott Bolton, who would go on to play over 150 games for the Cowboys and be a member of their 2015 NRL Grand Final and 2016 World Club Challenge winning sides.

Milestones 
 Round 1: Sione Faumuina and Jason Smith made their debuts for the club.
 Round 3: Justin Smith played his 50th game for the club.
 Round 4: Scott Bolton made his NRL debut for the club.
 Round 6: Ben Vaeau made his debut for the club.
 Round 7: Johnathan Thurston played his 50th game for the club.
 Round 7: Scott Minto made their debuts for the club.
 Round 7: Ben Farrar made his NRL debut for the club and scored his first NRL try.
 Round 9: Brett Anderson made his debut for the club.
 Round 9: Scott Bolton scored his first NRL try.
 Round 10: Sam Faust made his NRL debut for the club.
 Round 11: John Frith made his NRL debut for the club.
 Round 13: Ty Williams played his 100th game for the club.
 Round 13: Matthew Bartlett made his debut for the club.
 Round 13: Jackson Nicolau made his NRL debut for the club.
 Round 18: Aaron Payne played his 100th game for the club.
 Round 20: Matthew Bowen played his 150th game for the club.
 Round 22: Carl Webb played his 50th game for the club.
 Round 25: Paul Bowman played his 200th game for the club, the first player to do so.
 Finals Week 2: Jacob Lillyman played his 50th game for the club.

Squad List

Squad Movement

2007 Gains

2007 Losses

Ladder

Fixtures

Pre-season

Regular season

Finals

Statistics 

Source:

Representatives 
The following players played a representative match in 2007

Honours

League 
 Dally M Medal: Johnathan Thurston
 Dally M Fullback of the Year: Matthew Bowen
 Dally M Halfback of the Year: Johnathan Thurston
 Rugby League Week Player of the Year: Matthew Bowen
 Rugby League Week Player of the Year: Johnathan Thurston

Club 
 Paul Bowman Medal: Matthew Bowen
 Player's Player: Matthew Bowen
 Club Person of the Year: Tim Nugent and Nicole Balanzategui
 Rookie of the Year: Sam Faust
 Most Improved: Ashley Graham and Ray Cashmere

Feeder Clubs

Queensland Cup 
  North Queensland Young Guns - 1st, lost preliminary final

References

External links 
 Official North Queensland Cowboys Website

North Queensland Cowboys seasons
North Queensland Cowboys season